Starbucks is a chain of coffee shops.

Starbuck or Starbucks may also refer to:

People

Starbuck (surname), list of people with the family name
StarBuck, ring name of professional wrestler Michael Majalahti

Places

Antarctica
Starbuck Cirque, Oates Land
Starbuck Crater, Marie Byrd Land
Starbuck Glacier, Graham Land
Starbuck Peak, on South Georgia

North America
Starbuck, Manitoba, Canada
Starbuck, Minnesota, US
Starbuck, Washington, US

Oceania
Starbuck Island, an atoll of the Line Islands

Arts, entertainment, and media

Fictional characters
Starbuck, a character in the novel Moby-Dick
Starbuck, a character in Fire Bringer
Starbuck, a character in the play The Rainmaker by N. Richard Nash
Starbuck, a character in the 1956 film adaptation The Rainmaker
Starbuck, a character in The Snow Queen by Joan D. Vinge
Lieutenant Starbuck, a character in the 1978 Battlestar Galactica film and television series
Kara Thrace or "Starbuck", a character in the 2004 Battlestar Galactica television series
Dana Scully, or "Starbuck" as she was nicknamed by her father, from The X-Files

Film and television
Starbuck (film), a 2011 Canadian comedy
J.J. Starbuck, a crime drama series

Music
Starbuck (band), an American rock band
Starbucks (mixtape), a mixtape by All Star Cashville Prince and Young Buck
"Starbucks" (song), a 2002 song by A

Other businesses
 Starbuck Car and Wagon Company, a 19th-century manufacturer of trams in Birkenhead, England

See also 
Starbeck, an area of Harrogate in North Yorkshire, England